Gizo may refer to:

Gizo, Solomon Islands, the capital of the Western Province in the Solomon Islands
Gizo, Israel, a village in central Israel
Gizo (bible), a city mentioned in the Bible
Gizo (or Gizzo), a trickster spider figure in Hausa folklore